The modern names of Scottish islands stem from two main influences. There are many names that derive from the Scottish Gaelic language in the Hebrides and Firth of Clyde. In the Northern Isles most place names have a Norse origin. There are also some island place names that originate from three other influences, including a limited number that are essentially English language names, a few that are of Brittonic origin and some of an unknown origin that may represent a pre-Celtic language.

Scotland has over 790 offshore islands, most of which are to be found in four main groups: Shetland, Orkney, and the Hebrides, sub-divided into the Inner Hebrides and Outer Hebrides. There are also clusters of islands in the Firth of Clyde, Firth of Forth, and Solway Firth, and numerous small islands within the many bodies of fresh water in Scotland including Loch Lomond and Loch Maree.

The earliest written references to Scottish islands were made by authors in Classical antiquity. Many of the names for larger islands show some continuity although few of the names they identified for the smaller ones are cognate with the modern ones. Later writers such as Adomnán and the authors of the Irish annals also contributed to our understanding of these early toponyms.

Main languages

Early languages

As humans have lived on the islands of Scotland since at least Mesolithic times, it is clear that pre-modern languages must have been used, and by extension names for the islands, that have been lost to history. Proto-Celtic is the presumed ancestor language of all the known Celtic languages. Proponents of the controversial Vasconic substratum theory suggest that many western European languages contain remnants of an even older language family of "Vasconic languages", of which Basque is the only surviving member. This proposal was originally made by the German linguist Theo Vennemann, but has been rejected by other linguists.

A small number of island names may contain elements of such an early Celtic or pre-Celtic language, but no certain knowledge of any pre-Pictish language exists anywhere in Scotland.

Celtic languages
British or Brythonic was an ancient P-Celtic language spoken in Britain. It  is a form of Insular Celtic, which is descended from Proto-Celtic, the hypothetical parent language that many linguistics belief had already begun to diverge into separate dialects or languages in the first half of the first millennium BC. By the sixth century AD, scholars of early Insular history often begin to talk about four geographically separate forms of British: Welsh, Breton, Cornish, and the now extinct Cumbric language. These are collectively known as the Brythonic languages.  It is clear that whenever place names are recorded at an early date as having been transposed from a form of P-Celtic into Gaelic that this occurred prior to the transformation from "Old British" into modern Welsh. There are numerous Scottish place names with Brythonic roots although the number of island names involved is relatively small.

The Pictish language offers considerable difficulties. It is a term used for the language(s) thought to have been spoken by the Picts, the people of northern and central Scotland in the Early Middle Ages. It may have been a fifth branch of Brythonic; Kenneth H. Jackson thought that the evidence is weak, but Katherine Forsyth disagreed with his argument.
The idea that a distinct Pictish language was perceived at some point is  attested clearly in Bede's early 8th-century Historia ecclesiastica gentis Anglorum, which names it as distinct from both Old Welsh and Old Gaelic. However, there is virtually no direct attestation of Pictish short of the names of people found on monuments  in the lands controlled by the Picts - the area north of the Forth-Clyde line in the Early Middle Ages. Many of these monuments include elaborate carved symbols, but an understanding of their significance has so far proved as elusive as interpretation of the few written fragments, which have been described as resembling an "odd sort of gibberish". Nonetheless, there is significant indirect place-name evidence for the Picts use of Brythonic or P-Celtic. The term "Pritennic" is sometimes used to refer to the proto-Pictish language spoken in this area during the Iron Age.

Given the paucity of knowledge about the Pictish language it may be assumed that islands names with P-Celtic affiliations in the southern Hebrides, and Firths of Clyde and Forth are Brythonic and those to the north and west are of Pictish origin.

This Goidelic language arrived via Ireland due to the growing influence of the kingdom of Dalriada from the 6th century onwards. It is still spoken in parts of the Scottish Highlands and the Hebrides, and in Scottish cities by some communities. It was formerly spoken over a far wider area than today, even in the recent past. Scottish Gaelic, along with modern Manx and Irish, are descended from Middle Irish, a derivative of Old Irish, which is descended in turn from Primitive Irish. This the oldest known form of the Goidelic languages, which is known only from fragments, mostly personal names, inscribed on stone in the Ogham alphabet in Ireland and western Britain up to about the 6th century. The Beurla-reagaird is a Gaelic-based cant of the Scottish travelling community.

Norse and Norn
Old Norse is a North Germanic language that was spoken by inhabitants of Scandinavia and of their overseas settlements during the Viking Age, until about 1300. Its influence on Scots island names is considerable due to the development of both the Earldom of Orkney and the Kingdom of the Isles which resulted in almost all of the inhabitable islands of Scotland (except those in the Firth of Forth) coming under Norse control from the 9th to 13th centuries.

Norn is an extinct North Germanic language that developed from Old Norse and was spoken in Shetland,  Orkney and possibly Caithness. Together with Faroese, Icelandic and Norwegian it belongs to the West Scandinavian group. Very little written evidence of the language has survived and as a result it is not possible to distinguish any island names that may be Norn rather than Old Norse. After the Northern Isles were pledged to Scotland by Norway in the 15th century,  the early Scottish Earls spoke Gaelic when the majority of their subjects spoke Norn and both of these languages were then replaced by Insular Scots.

English and Scots
English is a West Germanic language, the modern variant of which is generally dated from about 1550. 
The related Scots language, sometimes regarded as a variety of English, has regional and historic importance in Scotland. It is officially recognised as autochthonous language under the European Charter for Regional or Minority Languages. It is a language variety  historically spoken in Lowland Scotland and parts of Ulster.

Although they are the dominant languages in modern Scotland the presence of both Scots and English in island names is limited.

Earliest names

The earliest written references to Scottish islands were made by classical authors in Latin and Ancient Greek. At a much later date the Ravenna Cosmography, which was compiled by an anonymous cleric in Ravenna around AD 700, mentions various Scottish island names. This document frequently used maps as a source of information and it has been possible to speculate about their modern equivalents based on assumptions about voyages made by early travellers 300–400 years prior to its creation. The presence of the monastery on Iona led to life in this part of Scotland in the Early Middle Ages being relatively well recorded from the mid-6th to the mid-9th century. Norse settlers in Scotland had a significant influence on toponyms from the 9th century onwards although there is little contemporary documentation of this period of Scottish history by those who lived there. From 849 on, when Columba's relics were removed in the face of Viking incursions, written evidence from local sources all but vanishes for three hundred years. Some modern island names appear to have ancient pre-Celtic roots as identified below.

Pytheas of Massilia visited Britain – probably sometime between 322 and 285 BC – and described it as triangular in shape, with a northern tip called Orcas. This may have referred to Dunnet Head on mainland Scotland, from which Orkney is visible. Writing in the 1st century AD, the Roman geographer Pomponius Mela called the islands of Orkney , as did Tacitus in 98 AD, claiming that his father-in-law Agricola had "discovered and subjugated the Orcades hitherto unknown" (although both Mela and Pliny the Elder had previously referred to the islands).

Writing about 80 years later, in 140-150 AD, Ptolemy, drawing on the earlier naval expeditions of Agricola, wrote that there were only five  (possibly meaning the Inner Hebrides) and Dumna.

For the individual Hebridean islands, Islay is Ptolemy's , Malaios is Mull and  his Scetis is presumed to be Skye (although it is not listed as one of the Ebudes).

Adomnán, the 7th century abbot of Iona, recorded the names of various islands in the Hebrides. Unlike the unnamed monk of Ravenna and his classical forebears, Adomnán was clearly writing about places with which he was familiar. It is therefore possible that some of these records indicate for the first time names used by the islands' inhabitants.There are also various early references from texts written in Ireland and Scotland - 'Celtic' in the list below.

The following table lists island names that are either recorded prior to AD 1200 or, in the case of the Norse names for the Suðreyjar, were probably recorded at a slightly later date but are likely to have been in use by then. The rulers of the Kingdom of the Isles, which comprised the Hebrides, the islands of the Firth of Clyde and the Isle of Man were of Norse origin from the mid-9th century.

These Scandinavian settlers were "past masters in the art of analogical reformation" meaning that when they heard the names of islands from the native population they amended the sounds so that they became "known words or phrases in their own language" in a way that did not reflect the original meaning. Thus Ljoðhús means "song-house" (an unlikely name for an island) and Orcades (probably "islands of the boar people") became Orkneyar meaning "seal islands".

Youngson offers suggestions for the other Scottish islands mentioned in the Ravenna Cosmography. He believes Sasura is the modern Scarba, Minerve is Holy Island  and Vinion is Sanda and that Daroeda, Gradena and Longis may be Lunga, The Garvellachs and Muck respectively. See below for further interpretations of the Ravenna list which is "obscure in the extreme".

Watson (1926) concluded that Adomnán's Airtraig is Shona but Geona and Ommon are unexplained and Longa could refer to several islands. It has also been suggested that Nave Island off Islay could be the identity of Elena.

For details of the first recorded Norse names for the individual islands of Orkney and Shetland, many of which will also have been in use prior to their being written down in the Norse sagas circa 1300, see Northern Isles. Gammeltoft also lists the Norse saga names of Kjarbarey (Kerrera), Rauney (Rona) and Sandey (Sanday) in the Hebrides and Saltíri, Satíri etc. referring to the peninsula of Kintyre. The Norse Barreyarfjorder is probably the Sound of Barra and Máeyar is the Isle of May in the Firth of Forth.

There are few other recorded names for these islands from early dates. Hudson suggests the Innisib Solian found in the Chronicle of the Kings of Alba refers to the island of Seil  and the Book of Leinster refers to the island as Sóil for AD 568. Hirta was recorded as "Hirt" in 1202.

In the above table there is some linguistic continuity between the earliest and modern names for almost all of the fifteen largest islands surrounding Scotland. However, the derivations of many of these early names are obscure "suggesting that they were coined very early on, some perhaps by the earliest settlers after the Ice Age. We do not know what languages the people spoke who may have coined some of these names." It therefore seems possible that the early Gaels were just as fond of "analogical reformation" as the Norse. Perhaps then we should think these island names "as pre-Celtic and also as pre-Indo-European, a solution ‒ if it solves anything - that leaves us with the thought that practically all the major islands in the Northern and Western Isles have very old names, so old and so linguistically and lexically opaque that we do not have any plausible referents for them elsewhere. They are linguistic fossils, perhaps some three thousand years old or even older."

Ravenna Cosmography interpretations
The main difference between Youngson/MacEeachern and Fitzpatrick-Matthews is that the former assumes two different routes for the relevant Ravenna listings whereas the latter assumes the second list is further north and west. Fitzpatrick-Matthews describes Rivet and Smith's identification of Bath in south-west England as "a little fanciful as we are dealing with islands in the northern part of the Irish Sea" and is sceptical about some of their other suggestions for similar reasons. Fitzpatrick-Matthews follows Rivet and Smith's suggestion for Erimon but as noted above Rùm is "Ruiminn" in the Félire Óengusso. Fitzpatrick-Matthews chooses Colonsay for Regaina although his reasoning for not preferring the "usual" identification of Rathlin may exaggerate Watson's remark on the topic.

The designation "desert island" may seem odd for a part of the world that experiences frequent rain, but the Celtic monastic system called their isolated retreat centres deserts and the implication is that a retreat of some kind existed there.

Modern names
The earliest comprehensive written list of Hebridean island names was undertaken by Donald Monro in his Description of 1549, which in some cases also provides the earliest written form of the modern island name.

Pre-Celtic remnants

There are three island names in Shetland of unknown and possibly pre-Celtic origin: Fetlar, Unst and Yell. The earliest recorded forms of these three names do carry Norse meanings: Fetlar is the plural of fetill and means "shoulder-straps" Omstr is "corn-stack" and í Ála  is from ál  meaning "deep furrow". However these descriptions are hardly obvious ones as island names and are
probably adaptations of a pre-Norse language.  This may have been Pictish but there is no clear evidence for this.

The roots of several of the Hebrides may also have a pre-Celtic origin. Indeed, the name comes from Ebudae recorded by Ptolemy, via the mis-reading "Hebudes" and may itself have a pre-Celtic root.
Mull was recorded by Ptolemy as Malaios possibly meaning "lofty isle" although it is pre-Gaelic in origin. In Norse times it became Mýl.
 The 7th century abbot of Iona Adomnán records Coll as Colosus and Tiree as Ethica, which may be pre-Celtic names.
 Islay is Ptolemy's Epidion, the use of the "p" hinting at a Brythonic or Pictish tribal name. Adomnán refers to the island as Ilea and it occurs in early Irish records as Ile and as Il in Old Norse. The root is not Gaelic and of unknown origin.
 The etymology of Skye is complex and may also include a pre-Celtic root.
Lewis is Ljoðhús in Old Norse and although various suggestions have been made as to a Norse meaning (such as "song house") the name is not of Gaelic origin and the Norse credentials are questionable.
The origin of Uist (Old Norse: Ívist) is similarly unclear.
Rùm may be from the Old Norse rõm-øy for "wide island" or Gaelic ì-dhruim meaning "isle of the ridge" although  Mac an Tàilleir (2003) is unequivocal that it is a "pre-Gaelic name and unclear".
Seil is probably a pre-Gaelic name, although a case has been made for a Norse derivation.
The etymology of Arran is also obscure. Haswell-Smith (2004) offers a Brythonic derivation and a meaning of "high place". The Acallam na Senórach  describes Arran as being "between Alba and Cruithen-land" although there is possible confusion in the annals between the meaning of Cruithen to refer to the Picts, the Cruithnigh of Ireland and the Welsh equivalent of Prydain to refer to Britain as a whole. In support of the Vasconic substratum hypothesis, Vennemann notes the recurrence of the element aran, (Unified Basque haran) meaning "valley", in names like Val d'Aran, Arundel, or Arendal. In early Irish literature Arran is "Aru" and Watson (1926) notes there are similar names in Wales but suggests it may be pre-Celtic.

Brythonic & Pictish names
Several of the islands of the Clyde have possible Brythonic roots. In addition to Arran (see above) Bute may have a British root and Great and Little Cumbrae both certainly have (see below).

Inchkeith in the Firth of Forth is recorded as "Insula Keth" in the 12th century Life of Saint Serf. The name may derive from  Innis Cheith or Innis Coit and both Mac an Tàilleir (2003) and Watson (1926) suggest that the root is the Brthyonic coed. The derivation would appear to be assumed rather than attested and the modern form is Innis Cheith. Caer in Welsh means a "stone-girt fort" and was especially applied to Roman camp sites. This is the root of Cramond Island in the Forth, with Caramond meaning "the fort on the Almond river". The island of Threave on the River Dee in Dumfries and Galloway takes its name from P-Celtic tref, meaning "homestead".

It is assumed that Pictish names must once have predominated in the northern Inner Hebrides, Outer Hebrides, Orkney and Shetland although the historical record is sparse. For example, Hunter (2000) states that in relation to King Bridei I of the Picts in the sixth century: "As for Shetland, Orkney, Skye and the Western Isles, their inhabitants, most of whom appear to have been Pictish in culture and speech at this time, are likely to have regarded Bridei as a fairly distant presence.” However, the place names that existed prior to the 9th century have been all but obliterated by the incoming Norse-speaking Gall-Ghaeils.

Orkney is pre-Norse in origin and Pictish, as may be the uninhabited Orkney island name Damsay, meaning "lady's isle". Remarkably few Pictish placenames of any kind can be identified in Orkney and Shetland, although some apparently Norse names may be adaptations of earlier Pictish ones. There are various  ogham inscriptions such as on the Lunnasting stone found in Shetland that have been claimed as representing Pictish, or perhaps even a precursor language.

In the 14th century John of Fordun also records the name of Inchcolm as "Eumonia" (referring to the monasterium Sancti Columbe in insula Euomonia) a name of likely Brythonic origin.

Norse names
From some point before 900 until the 14th century both Shetland and Orkney became Norse societies. The Norse also dominated the Hebrides  and the islands of the Clyde for much of the same period, although their influence was much weaker there from the 13th century onwards.  According to Ó Corráin (1998) "when and how the Vikings conquered and occupied the Isles is unknown, perhaps unknowable" although from 793 onwards repeated raids by Vikings on the British Isles are recorded. "All the islands of Britain" were devastated in 794 with Iona being sacked in 802 and 806.

As a result, most of the island names in Orkney and Shetland have Norse names and many in the Hebrides are Gaelic transformations of the original Norse, with the Norse ending -øy or -ey for "island" becoming -aigh in Gaelic and then -ay in modern Scots/English.

Gaelic influence

Perhaps surprisingly Shetland may have a Gaelic root—the name Innse Chat is referred to in early Irish literature and it is just possible that this forms part of the later Norn name Hjaltland— but the influence of this language in the toponymy of the Northern Isles is slight. No Gaelic-derived island names and indeed only two Q-Celtic words exist in the language of modern Orcadians - "iper" from eabhar, meaning a midden slurry, and "keero" from caora - used to describe a small sheep in the North Isles.

The Hebrides remain the stronghold of the modern Gàidhealtachd and unsurprisingly this language has had a significant influence on the islands there. It has been argued that the Norse impact on the onomasticon only applied to the islands north of Ardnamurchan and that original Gaelic place names predominate to the south. However, recent research suggests that the obliteration of pre-Norse names throughout the Hebrides was almost total and Gaelic derived place names on the southern islands are of post-Norse origin.

There are also examples of island names that were originally Gaelic but have become completely replaced. For example, Adomnán records Sainea, Elena, Ommon and Oideacha in the Inner Hebrides, which are of unknown location and these names must have passed out of usage in the Norse era. One of the complexities is that an island such as Rona may have had a Celtic name, that was replaced by a similar-sounding Norse name, but then reverted to an essentially Gaelic name with a Norse ending.

Scots and English names
In the context of the Northern Isles it should be borne in mind that Old Norse is a dead language and that as a result names of Old Norse origin exist only as loan words in the Scots language. Nonetheless if we distinguish between names of obviously Norse origin and those with a significant Scots element the great majority are in the former camp. "Muckle", meaning large or big, is one of few Scots words in the island names of the Nordreyar and appears in Muckle Roe and Muckle Flugga in Shetland and Muckle Green Holm and Muckle Skerry in Orkney.

Many small islets and skerries have Scots or Insular Scots names such as Da Skerries o da Rokness and Da Buddle Stane  in Shetland, and Kirk Rocks in Orkney.

Great Cumbrae and Little Cumbrae are English/Brythonic in derivation and there are other examples of the use of "great" and "little" such as Great Bernera and Rysa Little which are English/Gaelic and Norse/English respectively. The informal use of "Isle of" is commonplace, although only the Isle of Ewe, the Isle of May and Isle Martin of the larger Scottish islands use this nomenclature in a formal sense though the Ordnance Survey uses "Isle of" for Arran, Bute, Gigha, Mull, Noss, Skye and Raasay. "Island" also occurs, as in Island Macaskin and Mealista Island although both islands are also known by their Gaelic names of Eilean Macaskin and Eilean Mhealasta. Holy Island off Arran is an entirely English name as is the collective Small Isles. Ailsa Craig is also known as "Paddy's Milestone". Big Scare in the Solway Firth is an English/Norse combination, the second word coming from sker, a skerry.

Some smaller islets and skerries have English names such as Barrel of Butter and the Old Man of Hoy in Orkney and Maiden Island and Bottle Island in the Inner Hebrides.

The Norse often gave animal names to islands and these have been transferred into English in for example, the Calf of Flotta and Horse of Copinsay. Brother Isle is an anglicisation of breiðare-øy meaning "broad beach island". The Norse holmr, meaning  "a small and rounded islet" has become "Holm" in English and there are numerous examples of this use including Corn Holm, Thieves Holm and Little Holm.

Summary of inhabited islands
Etymological details for all inhabited islands and some larger uninhabited ones are provided at Hebrides, Northern Isles, Islands of the Clyde and Islands of the Forth.

Based on these tables, for the inhabited off-shore islands of Scotland (and counting Lewis and Harris as two islands for this purpose) the following results apply, excluding Scots/English qualifiers such as "muckle" "east", "little" etc.

See also
 Languages of Scotland
 Etymology of Arran
 Etymology of Gigha
 Origin of names of St Kilda
 List of Scottish Gaelic place names
 Goidelic substrate hypothesis
 Insular Celtic languages

References
Notes

Footnotes

General references

 Ballin Smith, B. and Banks, I. (eds) (2002) In the Shadow of the Brochs, the Iron Age in Scotland. Stroud. Tempus. 
 Ballin Smith, Beverley; Taylor, Simon; and Williams, Gareth (2007) West over Sea: Studies in Scandinavian Sea-Borne Expansion and Settlement Before 1300. Leiden. Brill. 
 Broderick, George (2013) "Some Island Names in the Former 'Kingdom of the Isles': a reappraisal." The Journal of Scottish Name Studies. 7.
 Caldwell, David H. (2011) Islay, Jura and Colonsay: A Historical Guide. Edinburgh. Birlinn. 
 Clarkson, Tim (2008) The Picts: A History. Stroud. The History Press. 

 Gammeltoft, Peder (2010) "Shetland and Orkney Island-Names – A Dynamic Group". Northern Lights, Northern Words. Selected Papers from the FRLSU Conference, Kirkwall 2009, edited by Robert McColl Millar.
 
 Hunter, James (2000) Last of the Free: A History of the Highlands and Islands of Scotland. Edinburgh. Mainstream. 
  Hudson, Benjamin T. (October 1998) "The Scottish Chronicle". Scottish Historical Review. 77. Issue 204
 Jennings, Andrew and Kruse, Arne "One Coast-Three Peoples: Names and Ethnicity in the Scottish West during the Early Viking period" in Woolf, Alex (ed.) (2009) Scandinavian Scotland – Twenty Years After. St Andrews. St Andrews University Press. 
 Jones, Charles (ed.) (1997) The Edinburgh history of the Scots language. Edinburgh University Press. 
 King, Jacob and Cotter, Michelle (2012)  Place-names in Islay and Jura. Perth. Scottish Natural Heritage.
 
 Mackenzie, William Cook (1906) The Races of Ireland and Scotland. Alexander Gardner. Paisley.
 Monro, Sir Donald (1549) A Description Of The Western Isles of Scotland. Appin Regiment/Appin Historical Society. Retrieved 3 March 2007. First published in by William Auld, Edinburgh 1774.
 Murray, W. H. (1966) The Hebrides. London. Heinemann.
 Murray, W.H. (1973) The Islands of Western Scotland. London. Eyre Methuen. SBN 413303802
 
 Omand, Donald (ed.) (2003) The Orkney Book. Edinburgh. Birlinn. 
 Omand, Donald (ed.) (2006) The Argyll Book. Edinburgh. Birlinn. 
 Rae, Robert J. "A Voyage in Search of Hinba" in Historic Argyll (2011) No. 16. Lorn Archaeological and Historical Society. Edited by J Overnell.
 Ross, David (2007) Dictionary of Scottish Place-names. Edinburgh. Birlinn/Scotland on Sunday. (Ross generally quotes dates but not sources, which are presumed to be 'Celtic'.)
 Sandnes, Berit (2003) From Starafjall to Starling Hill: An investigation of the formation and development of Old Norse place-names in Orkney. (pdf) Doctoral Dissertation, NTU Trondheim.
 Sandnes, Berit (2010) "Linguistic patterns in the place-names of Norway and the Northern Isles" Northern Lights, Northern Words. Selected Papers from the FRLSU Conference, Kirkwall 2009, edited by Robert McColl Millar.
 Thompson, Francis (1968) Harris and Lewis, Outer Hebrides. Newton Abbot. David & Charles. 
 Thomson, William P.L. (2008) The New History of Orkney. Edinburgh. Birlinn. 
 Watson, W. J. (2004) The Celtic Place-Names of Scotland. Edinburgh. Birlinn. . First published 1926.
 Woolf, Alex "The Age of the Sea-Kings: 900–1300" in Omand, Donald (ed.) (2006) The Argyll Book. Edinburgh. Birlinn. 
 
 Youngson, Peter (2001) Jura: Island of Deer. Edinburgh. Birlinn. 

Scottish toponymy
Islands of Scotland
Place name etymologies